Gone 'Til November: A Journal of Rikers Island is a prison memoir from the diary of American rap artist, Lil Wayne. It was initially published on October 11, 2016, via Plume Books, a subdivision of Penguin Books. The book describes Wayne's experience on New York prison Rikers Island, where he was incarcerated for eight months in 2010. The book details, among other things how Wayne served as a suicide prevention aide as well as how he attempted suicide himself.

Reception 
Upon release, Gone 'Til November received mostly positive reviews from readers and critics alike with Rolling Stone naming it a 2016 "must-read". However some, like the LA Times, criticized the book for a lack of discussion of serious issues faced by the majority of inmates in prison.

References 

2016 non-fiction books
American memoirs
Lil Wayne
Rikers Island
Plume (publisher) books